Kornél Szántó (born 26 May 1978) is a Hungarian short track speed skater. He competed in two events at the 2002 Winter Olympics on track of 1000m and 1500m.

References

External links
 

1978 births
Living people
Hungarian male short track speed skaters
Olympic short track speed skaters of Hungary
Short track speed skaters at the 2002 Winter Olympics
Sportspeople from Szombathely